Cylindrolobus is a genus of orchids with about 80 species that grow in New Guinea, Wallacea, Southeast Asia, southern China, and India.

Description
These herbs are epiphytic, but also rarely terrestrial. The elongate stems are slender and usually not pseudobulbous (though some species do possess a few terminal internodes, sometimes slightly swollen), with leaves along the entire length, except for  some nodes at the base where persistent leaf sheaths have formed, or with some leaves towards the end/apex. The leathery leaves are alternate, conduplicate, and their shape can be linear-oblanceolate, or either narrowly elliptic or ovate. The leaves articulate to a sheathing base that tightly envelopes the stem. The usually short or slender inflorescences occur either laterally on many nodes or come from the terminal node of the stem, and have only 1 or 2-3 flowers. The peduncle is usually very much reduced. The few floral bracts are spirally arranged (in a few species they are conspicuous, brightly coloured and fleshy). The flowers are mostly coloured white or cream, though some species have ochre-yellow flowers. Flowers are medium-sized, glabrous (smooth) or with sparse stellate-hairs on the abaxial surface to the sepals. Pedicel and ovary are glabrous. Sepals vary, dorsally they are free, often recurved, while the lateral sepals are oblique at the base, forming with column foot a blunt oblique mentum. The petals are free and small than the sepals, their curved lip is three-lobed, hinged to a column foot, and adorned with a papillose, subglobose callus and either papillose keels or laminate keels. The lateral lobes are erect, and enclose the column. In most species the mid-lobe is smaller than lateral-lobes. The short column has a foot shorter than or about as long as the column proper. There are 8 rectangular pollinia, arranged in pair-series, a large and a small in each pair, with the posterior 4 are much smaller.

The few-flowered, glabrous axillary inflorescence is a diagnostic trait amongst sympodial taxa in the Epidendroideae subfamily p.p.

Distribution
The species of Cylindrolobus grow from New Guinea to Tropical Asia to south Zhōngguó/China. Countries and regions that members of the taxa grow in include: New Guinea, Lesser Sunda Islands, Maluku, Sulawesi, Philippines, Borneo, Java, Sumatra, Malaya, Thailand, Cambodia, Vietnam, Laos, Myanmar, Assam, East Himalaya, India, Tibet, and South Central China.

Species

Cylindrolobus alboluteus 
Cylindrolobus aliciae 
Cylindrolobus aporoides 
Cylindrolobus arunachalensis 
Cylindrolobus aurantiacus 
Cylindrolobus beccarianus 
Cylindrolobus benchaii 
Cylindrolobus benmabantae 
Cylindrolobus bidupensis 
Cylindrolobus biflorus 
Cylindrolobus brachystachyus 
Cylindrolobus burleyi 
Cylindrolobus carneus 
Cylindrolobus carunculosus 
Cylindrolobus clavicaulis 
Cylindrolobus clemensiorum 
Cylindrolobus compressus 
Cylindrolobus cootesii 
Cylindrolobus cristatus 
Cylindrolobus cyrtosepalus 
Cylindrolobus dacrydium 
Cylindrolobus datuguinae 
Cylindrolobus dentrecasteauxii 
Cylindrolobus dilutus 
Cylindrolobus elatus 
Cylindrolobus elisheae 
Cylindrolobus erythrostictus 
Cylindrolobus exappendiculatus 
Cylindrolobus fastigiatifolius 
Cylindrolobus fimbrilobus 
Cylindrolobus foetidus 
Cylindrolobus glabriflorus 
Cylindrolobus glandulifer 
Cylindrolobus gloensis 
Cylindrolobus gramineus 
Cylindrolobus gretcheniae 
Cylindrolobus hallieri 
Cylindrolobus hegdei 
Cylindrolobus jensenianus 
Cylindrolobus kalabakanensis 
Cylindrolobus kalelotong 
Cylindrolobus kandarianus 
Cylindrolobus kenejianus 
Cylindrolobus korinchensis 
Cylindrolobus lamonganensis 
Cylindrolobus leptocarpus 
Cylindrolobus leucanthus 
Cylindrolobus lindleyi 
Cylindrolobus linearifolius 
Cylindrolobus lohitensis 
Cylindrolobus longerepens 
Cylindrolobus longissimus 
Cylindrolobus longpasiaensis 
Cylindrolobus marginatus 
Cylindrolobus megalophus 
Cylindrolobus microbambusa 
Cylindrolobus motuoensis 
Cylindrolobus mucronatus 
Cylindrolobus neglectus 
Cylindrolobus nutans 
Cylindrolobus oliviacamposiae 
Cylindrolobus pauciflorus 
Cylindrolobus perspicabile 
Cylindrolobus pinguis 
Cylindrolobus pseudoclavicaulis 
Cylindrolobus pseudorigidus 
Cylindrolobus puakensis 
Cylindrolobus quadricolor 
Cylindrolobus rhodoleucus 
Cylindrolobus tenuicaulis 
Cylindrolobus truncatus 
Cylindrolobus uniflorus 
Cylindrolobus uninodus 
Cylindrolobus validus 
Cylindrolobus verruculosus 
Cylindrolobus virginalis 
Cylindrolobus warianus 
Cylindrolobus warnementiae

Further reading
Govaerts, R. (1999). World Checklist of Seed Plants 3(1, 2a & 2b): 1-1532. MIM, Deurne. [Cited as Eria.]
Govaerts, R. (2003). World Checklist of Monocotyledons Database in ACCESS: 1-71827. The Board of Trustees of the Royal Botanic Gardens, Kew. [Cited as Eria.]
Ng, Y.P. & al. (2018). Phylogenetics and systematics of Eria and related genera (Orchidaceae: Podochileae) Botanical Journal of the Linnean Society 186: 179-201.
Pridgeon, A.M., Cribb, P.J., Chase, M.C. & Rasmussen, F.N. (2006). Epidendroideae (Part One) Genera Orchidacearum 4: 1-672. Oxford University Press, New York, Oxford. [Cited as Callostylis.]
Wu, Z. & Hong, D. (eds.) (2009). Flora of China 25: 1-570. Missouri Botanical Garden Press, St. Louis.

References

External links

 
Podochileae genera